Chalmers Ballong Corps (CBC) is a students' hot-air ballooning club at Chalmers University of Technology in Gothenburg, Sweden. (The word Ballong is Swedish for Balloon.)

The society was founded in 1976 and has since become one of the largest and most active ballooning clubs in Sweden.

External links
 Chalmers Ballong Corps - Official site

References

Chalmers University of Technology
Air sports